Al-Khayma was a Palestinian Arab village in the Ramle Subdistrict of Mandatory Palestine. It was depopulated during the 1948 Arab–Israeli War on July 9, 1948, by the Givati Brigade of Operation An-Far. It was located 18.5 km south of Ramla.

History
In 1863,   Victor Guérin  found that it had two hundred and fifty inhabitants.

In 1882, the PEF's Survey of Western Palestine  noted it as principally an adobe village of "on low ground", and with a well to the east.

British Mandate era
In the 1922 census of Palestine, conducted by the British Mandate authorities, Khaimeh  had a population of 132 Muslims,  increasing in the 1931 census  to 141 Muslims, in 30 houses.

In the 1945 statistics, the village had a population of 190, all Muslim, and the total land area was 5,150 dunums. Of this, 4 dunams were irrigated or used for plantations, 5,007 were used for cereals,  while 9 dunams were classified as built-up urban areas.

1948 and aftermath
Morris list both date and reason for depopulation as "not known". However, he also notes it in connection with Operation An-Far, in mid July 1948.

Following the 1948 war, the area was incorporated into the State of Israel and in August 1948 al-Khaymas was one of 21 Palestinian villages whose land was proposed for resettlement with an Israeli village named Revadim. In November, 1948, the proposal to establish Revadim on al-Khayma's land was passed.

Revadim was eventually established close to village land, according to Morris, however, according to Khalidi, Revadim is located north of al-Khayma, on the land of the depopulated Palestinian village of al-Mukhayzin.

In 1992 the village site was described: "All that remains of the village are three mounds to the east, west, and south of the site that contain the remnants of houses. A girder protrudes from the eastern mound and there is a large, deserted well at the mounds centre. A large artificial pond lies about 100 m northeast of the site, and there is a monument next to a well about 0.5 km to the north. An inscription on the monument reads: To the eMemory of the Members of Kibbutz Revadim, who Settled on the Land in 1948."

References

Bibliography

External links
Welcome To al-Khayma
al-Khayma,  Zochrot
Survey of Western Palestine, Map 16:   IAA, Wikimedia commons  
al-Khayma, from the Khalil Sakakini Cultural Center

Arab villages depopulated during the 1948 Arab–Israeli War
District of Ramla